Jarigan (Persian Jari/zari for lamentation and Bengali gan for song) or (song of sorrow) is one of the few indigenous music art performances of Bangladesh, West Bengal, Barak Valley and Brahmaputra Valley . Though varied and divergent in form, most are based on legends relating to Muslim heroes Hasan ibn Ali and Husayn ibn Ali, grandsons of Muhammad and other members of his family at Karbala. The most renowned is jari gan from eastern Mymensingh, which commemorates the death of Hosain at Karbala. The performers, who are male Sunni Muslims, work chiefly as farmers.

The origins of Jarigan may be traced back to the early 17th century when poetry started being written on the tragic stories of Karbala. One of the earliest recorded is Muhammad Khan's poem on Karbala titled Maktul Hussain (The Martyrdom of Hussain) in 1645, when Shi'ism had reached Bengal via Persia.

References

Bangladeshi music
Bengali music
Islamic music
Sufi music